Marinelli Creek is a watercourse whose headwaters emerge from the melting of Marinelli Glacier in Tierra del Fuego, Chile.  Marinelli Creek discharges to Ainsworth Bay, a notable inlet along the Almirantazgo Fjord. The Marinelli Glacier has been in a state of retreat since at least 1943, and the retreat continues to the present time of 2008.

See also
 Southern elephant seal

References

Sources
 C. Michael Hogan. 2008 Bahia Wulaia Dome Middens, The Megalithic Portal, ed. A. Burnham
 United States Geological Survey (USGS). 1999. Historic Fluctuations of Outlet Glaciers from the Patagonian Ice Fields

Rivers of Chile
Rivers of Magallanes Region
Isla Grande de Tierra del Fuego